The 2017–18 Coppa Italia, also known as TIM Cup for sponsorship reasons, was the 71st edition of the national cup in Italian football.
As a minimum, the winners of the Coppa Italia earn a place in the 2018–19 Europa League and would begin play in the group stage unless they qualify for a more favourable UEFA placing based on league play. Seventy-eight clubs participated in this season's cup competition.

Juventus won the championship for the 13th time by defeating Milan 4–0, and extended their record consecutive win streak to four.  They had previously defeated Lazio (in 2014–15 and 2016–17) and Milan (in 2015–16).  They did not concede a goal in any of the five games played in this year's competition, outscoring their opponents 10–0 on aggregate.

Participating teams

Serie A (20 teams)

Atalanta
Benevento
Bologna
Cagliari
Chievo
Crotone
Fiorentina
Genoa
Hellas Verona
Internazionale
Juventus
Lazio
Milan
Napoli
Roma
Sampdoria
Sassuolo
SPAL
Torino
Udinese

Serie B (22 teams)

Ascoli
Avellino
Bari
Brescia
Carpi
Cesena
Cittadella
Cremonese
Empoli
Foggia
Frosinone
Novara
Palermo
Parma
Perugia
Pescara
Pro Vercelli
Salernitana
Spezia
Ternana
Venezia
Virtus Entella

Serie C (27 teams)

AlbinoLeffe
Alessandria
Arezzo
Bassano Virtus
Casertana
Cosenza
FeralpiSalò
Giana Erminio
Gubbio
Juve Stabia
Lecce
Livorno
Lucchese
Matera
Padova
Paganese
Pro Piacenza
Piacenza
Pisa
Pordenone
Reggiana
Renate
Sambenedettese
Siracusa
Trapani
Vicenza
Virtus Francavilla

Serie D (9 teams)

Nuova Monterosi
Massese
Varese
Trastevere
Imolese
Rende
Triestina
Ciliverghe Mazzano
Matelica

Format and seeding
Teams entered the competition at various stages, as follows:
 First phase (one-legged fixtures)
 First round: 36 teams from Serie C and Serie D started the tournament
 Second round: the eighteen winners from the previous round were joined by the 22 Serie B teams
 Third round: the twenty winners from the second round met the twelve Serie A sides seeded 9–20
 Fourth round: the sixteen winners faced each other
 Second phase
 Round of 16 (one-legged): the eight fourth round winners were inserted into a bracket with the Serie A clubs seeded 1–8
 Quarter-finals (one-legged)
 Semi-finals (two-legged)
 Final (one-legged)

Round dates
The schedule of each round was as follows:

First stage

First round
A total of 36 teams from Serie C and Serie D competed in this round, eighteen of which advanced to second round. The first round matches were played between 29 and 30 July 2017.

Second round
A total of forty teams from Serie B, Serie C and Serie D competed in the second round, twenty of which advanced to join twelve teams from Serie A in the third round. The second round matches were played on 5 and 6 August 2017.

Third round
A total of 32 teams from Serie A, Serie B and Serie C competed in the third round, sixteen of which advanced to the fourth round. The third round matches were played from 11–13 August 2017.

Fourth round
The fourth round matches were played between 28–30 November 2017. All times were CET (UTC+1).

Final stage

Bracket

Round of 16
Round of 16 matches were played from 12–20 December 2017.

Quarter-finals
Quarter-final matches were played from 26 December 2017 to 3 January 2018.

Semi-finals
For the semi-finals, the first legs were played on 30 and 31 January and the second on 28 February 2018.

First leg

Second leg

Final

Top goalscorers

See also
 2017–18 Serie A

References

External links

 soccerway.com

Coppa Italia seasons
Coppa Italia
Italy